Park Gun-woo (also known as Park Geon-wu, born 31 March 1981 in Seoul) is a South Korean sailor, who specialized in two-person dinghy (470) and open match racing classes. He claimed a bronze medal, as a member of the South Korean sailing team, in match racing at the 2010 Asian Games, and later represented South Korea at the 2012 Summer Olympics. As of September 2013, Park is ranked no. 134 in the world for two-person dinghy class by the International Sailing Federation.

Park made his official debut at the 2010 Asian Games in Guangzhou, where he captured a bronze medal for the South Korean team in a match duel against the host nation China with a scintillating record of 3–1.

At the 2012 Summer Olympics in London, Park competed as a boat skipper in the men's 470 class by receiving a berth from the World Championships in Barcelona, Spain. Teaming with his crew member and partner Cho Sung-Min in the opening series, Park pulled off a twenty-second-place finish in a fleet of twenty-seven boats with an accumulated net score of 169 points.

References

External links
 
 
 
 

1981 births
Living people
South Korean male sailors (sport)
Olympic sailors of South Korea
Sailors at the 2012 Summer Olympics – 470
Sailors at the 2020 Summer Olympics – 470
Asian Games medalists in sailing
Asian Games silver medalists for South Korea
Asian Games bronze medalists for South Korea
Sailors at the 2010 Asian Games
Sailors at the 2014 Asian Games
Medalists at the 2010 Asian Games
Medalists at the 2014 Asian Games
Sportspeople from Seoul